Wales Adams (March 2, 1804 – November 2, 1879) was a member of the Michigan House of Representative from 1844-1845.  Adams was a native of Massachusetts.  In 1831 he founded Adams Mills, Michigan. He died in Bronson, Michigan.

References

Sources

1804 births
Members of the Michigan House of Representatives
1879 deaths
19th-century American politicians
People from Branch County, Michigan